Christopher Paul Sutherland (born 4 August 1995) is an English footballer who plays as a winger for Northern Premier League Division One North club Hyde United.

Career
Sutherland made his professional debut for Oldham Athletic on 15 September 2012, as a second-half substitute, in a 2–2 draw with Notts County at Boundary Park. On 26 August, Sutherland was sent out on a months loan to Barrow. He was released by Oldham in January 2014 and he subsequently joined Northern Premier League Premier Division side Ashton United in the summer of 2015 but was released by them the following November. On 18 December, Sutherland joined National League side Macclesfield Town. He went on to make nine appearances across 2015–16 and 2016–17 before joining Northern Premier League Division One North club Hyde United on a one-month loan on 6 January 2017.

Career statistics
.

References

External links
 
 

1995 births
Living people
Ashton United F.C. players
Association football midfielders
Barrow A.F.C. players
English Football League players
English footballers
Footballers from St Helens, Merseyside
Hyde United F.C. players
Macclesfield Town F.C. players
National League (English football) players
Northern Premier League players
Oldham Athletic A.F.C. players